Child abuse inquiry may refer to:

 Mother and Baby Homes Commission of Investigation - Irish inquiry, which reported in 2021
 Commission to Inquire into Child Abuse - Irish inquiry, which published the Ryan Report in 2009
 Ferns Report - 2005 report into child abuse in the Diocese of Ferns, in Ireland
 Independent Inquiry into Child Sexual Abuse - 2014 English & Welsh inquiry
 Murphy Report - Irish report, published in 2009, on the Sexual abuse cases in the Catholic archdiocese of Dublin